Ariel Córdova Wilson  is a Mexican politician affiliated with the Ecologist Green Party of Mexico. As of 2014 he served as Deputy of the LIX Legislature of the Mexican Congress as a plurinominal representative as replacement of Alejandro Moreno Cárdenas.

References

Date of birth unknown
Living people
Politicians from Campeche
Members of the Chamber of Deputies (Mexico)
Institutional Revolutionary Party politicians
Ecologist Green Party of Mexico politicians
Year of birth missing (living people)
21st-century Mexican politicians
Deputies of the LIX Legislature of Mexico